This page lists board and card games, wargames, miniatures games, and tabletop role-playing games published in 2022. For video games, see 2022 in video gaming.

Games released or invented in 2022 
 Frosthaven

Game awards given in 2022

Significant games-related events in 2022

Deaths

See also
 List of game manufacturers
 2022 in video gaming

References

Games
Games by year